Now That's What I Call Dance Classics is a compilation album in the U.S. Now! series released on November 3, 2009, consisting of popular dance tracks released between 1978 and 1996. It peaked at number three on the Billboard Dance/Electronic Albums chart.

Track listing

Charts

Weekly charts

Year-end charts

References

2009 compilation albums
Dance-pop compilation albums
Dance Classics